Česlovas Sasnauskas (19 July 1867, in Kapčiamiestis – 18 January 1916, in Saint Petersburg) was a Lithuanian composer.

Sasnauskas worked as an organist in Vilkaviškis and also played in Saint Petersburg upon relocating there in 1891.

Besides two requiems and several cantatas, he composed many pieces for organ and published his arrangements of Lithuanian folksongs, as well as a collection of his own songs in the folk idiom.

References
 Biography extracted and translated from Antanas Pupienis Po Dz ukijos dangumi: Lazdiju krastas ir zmones (1994)

1867 births
1916 deaths
Lithuanian classical composers
Lithuanian organists
Male organists
Male classical composers
Romantic composers
20th-century male musicians
19th-century male musicians
Burials at Petrašiūnai Cemetery